The Orleans County Courthouse and Jail Complex is a historic government facility on Main Street in the city of Newport, Vermont, the shire town of Orleans County.  The complex includes a fine Romanesque courthouse built in 1886, a wood-frame jailer's quarters built in 1886 (now housing the sheriff's office), and a 1903 brick jail.  The complex was listed on the National Register of Historic Places in 1984.

Description and history
The Orleans County Courthouse stands prominently in the center of downtown Newport, on the south side of Main Street between 3rd and 2nd Streets.  Just to its east stands the federal U.S. Courthouse, Post Office and Customs House.  It is a -story brick building, with a hip roof.  A gabled entrance section projects from the center of the main facade, rising through a bellcast stage at the roof level to an elaborate two-stage clock tower topped by a pyramidal roof.  The eaves and gable edges are adorned with dentil moulding, and windows in the upper level of the projecting section are set in recessed round-arch openings, a detail echoed by blind arches in the first stage of the tower.  Entrances are also set in large round-arch openings on the ground floor.  Bands of brick corbelling set off the floors from each other, with another below the eave.

The 1886 jailer's house is a two-story wood-frame structure with a gabled roof, and is three bays wide and two deep.  It is simply trimmed, and is connected via a wooden ell to the 1903 jail.  That building is a basically cubical masonry structure, two stories in height, finished in brick with granite trim.  It has a hip roof with an elaborate corbelled eave.

The county complex was built in 1886, following a decision by the state legislature to move the seat of Orleans County from Irasburg, centrally located but isolated and agrarian, to the bustling lakefront and railroad-supported town of Newport.  The city of Newport would be incorporated in 1918 out of part of the towns of Newport and Derby, and retain the shire town status.  The courthouse was designed by Lambert Packard, a prominent local architect.  He also designed the original 1886 jail, which was deemed inadequate for the county's needs and replaced in 1903 by a "mail order" structure designed by the Pauly Jail Company of St. Louis, Missouri.

See also
National Register of Historic Places listings in Orleans County, Vermont

References

Courthouses on the National Register of Historic Places in Vermont
National Register of Historic Places in Orleans County, Vermont
Queen Anne architecture in Vermont
Romanesque Revival architecture in Vermont
Government buildings completed in 1886
Buildings and structures in Newport (city), Vermont
Individually listed contributing properties to historic districts on the National Register in Vermont